U Minh Thượng National Park or National Park of Upper U Minh (Vietnamese language: Vườn quốc gia U Minh Thượng) is a national park in the province of Kiên Giang, Vietnam.

Establishment
It was established according to decision number 11/2002/QĐ-TTg, dated 14 January 2002, signed by then Vietnamese Prime Minister Nguyễn Tấn Dũng.  This decision turned the U Minh Thuong Nature Reserve into U Minh Thuong National Park.

Area and location

Flora and fauna
U Minh Thuong National Park is widely considered the richest region of the Mekong delta in terms of plant and animal biodiversity. It boasts of over 243 plant species. The park has a rich and varied mammalian population, totaling an impressive 32 species, including hairy-nosed otters and fishing cats. U Minh Thuong National Park is a haven for rare and endangered birds. A total of 187 species of birds has been recorded here, including the oriental darter, spot-billed pelican, black-headed ibis, glossy ibis, greater spotted eagle and Asian golden weaver. There are also a total of 39 amphibian species and 34 species of fish in the park. Both the saltwater crocodile and the Siamese crocodile were once found here, but a 2002 study concluded that both species were extinct in the park.

First Indochina War and Vietnam War
During the First Indochina War the U Minh Forest was a Viet Minh stronghold. In 1952, 500 French paratroopers dropped into the U Ming forest to attack Viet Minh and were never heard from again. During the Vietnam War it was a Vietcong base area. Officers Humbert Roque Versace and James N. Rowe of the United States Army were captured by the Vietcong during a battle in the U Minh Forest in October 1963. Versace was posthumously awarded the Medal of Honor by American Military and Rowe escaped five years later. American politician John Kerry commanded a Swift boat in the area during the Vietnam War, known as the American War in Vietnam.

References

External links
 Factsheet on U Minh Thuong National Park
 YouTube: Footage ARVN Rangers of the South Vietnamese Army patrolling in the U Minh Forest (1970)

Geography of Kiên Giang province
National parks of Vietnam
Protected areas established in 2002
2002 establishments in Vietnam
Vietnam War sites
ASEAN heritage parks